The Esma Sultan Mansion, a historical yalı located on the Bosphorus in the Ortaköy neighborhood of Istanbul, Turkey and named after its original owner Princess Esma Sultan, is used today as a cultural center after being redeveloped.

History 
The three-storey brick manor was designed by the renowned architect Sarkis Balyan and finished in 1875 next to Ortaköy Mosque. It was presented to the Princess Esma Sultan, the daughter of Ottoman Sultan Abdulaziz, as a wedding gift in 1889.

The mansion remained in the possession of the Ottoman dynasty until 1915. Subsequently, the building was used first as a tobacco warehouse and then as a coal depot from 1920 until 1975 when it was destroyed by a fire.

Redevelopment 

The ruin, consisting only of the outer walls of the building, was purchased in the early 1990s by The Marmara Collection. Following a renovation with additions designed by architects Haluk Sezgin and Philippe Robert, the mansion was opened in 2001 as a multipurpose event venue. Within the brick exterior, which was left as the original, a steel and glass structure is incorporated. According to the GAD Architecture Group, a redesign by the architect Gökhan Avcıoğlu was completed in 2005. The building includes a bar, a restaurant, and an event hall at several levels.

Esma Sultana Mansion, run by The Marmara Hotel chain as a venue for various meetings and conferences, offers banqueting space in a historical atmosphere for up to 1,000 guests in the garden, 180 guests in the ground floor and 330 guests in the first floor. Space for reception is available for up to 3,000 guests in the garden, 300 guests in the ground floor and 600 guests in the first floor. The venue also hosts concerts of the Istanbul International Jazz Festival and the Istanbul International Music Festival.

References 

Houses completed in 1875
Sarkis Balyan buildings
Ottoman palaces in Istanbul
Redevelopment projects in Istanbul
Restaurants in Istanbul
Music venues in Istanbul
Tobacco buildings
Bosphorus
Beşiktaş
19th-century architecture in Turkey